Admiral Sir Charles Frederick Alexander Shadwell,  (31 January 1814 – 1 March 1886) was a Royal Navy officer who went on to be Commander-in-Chief, China Station.

Naval career
Born the fourth son of Sir Lancelot Shadwell, Charles Shadwell joined the Royal Navy in 1827. He was present during operations off Syria in 1840. In 1850 he became Commander in HMS Sphinx  and took part in the Second Anglo-Burmese War. Promoted Captain in 1853, he commanded HMS Highflyer from 1856 and took part in the capture of Canton and the Battle of Taku Forts during the Second Opium War. He commanded HMS Aboukir from 1861 and HMS Hastings from 1862. He was appointed Captain-Superintendent of Gosport victualling-yard in 1864 and Commander-in-Chief, China Station in 1871. He was elected a Fellow of the Royal Society in 1861. In 1878 he was made President of the Royal Naval College, Greenwich.

He retired in 1879 and in retirement lived at Meadow Bank in Melksham in Wiltshire. He died unmarried in 1886.

See also

References

|-

1814 births
1886 deaths
Admiral presidents of the Royal Naval College, Greenwich
Royal Navy admirals
Knights Commander of the Order of the Bath
Fellows of the Royal Society